Thesiger Bay is a Canadian Arctic waterway in the Northwest Territories. It is an arm of the Beaufort Sea on southwestern Banks Island. The Masik River empties into Thesiger Bay.

Ringed seal frequent the area.

References

External links
 Diagram

Bays of the Northwest Territories